The Jump returned for a second series on 1 February 2015. The series was once again hosted by Davina McCall and broadcast live from Austria on Channel 4. On 20 January 2015, it was announced that a new show would air over on sister channel E4 called On the Piste from 2 February, and would be presented by Cherry Healey.

Contestants
The sixteen original celebrities taking part were revealed on 10 December 2014. On 13 December, it was announced that Ola Jordan had to pull out of the competition due to injury. At the time, it was not known whether she would be replaced; however, on 4 January 2015, it was revealed that Chloe Madeley would replace her. On 9 January it was announced that Sally Bercow had to pull out of the competition due to injury; she was replaced by Jodie Kidd.

Live shows
The series began on 1 February 2015, running for eight days until the final on 9 February (with no show on 7 February). During the live ski jump, the celebrities were given the option of three jumps – K15 (small), K24 (medium) or K40 (the largest). The celebrity that jumped the shortest distance was eliminated. For shows three and eight, which were broadcast live from Kühtai, a brand new eliminator called the "Air Jump" was introduced: the celebrities jumped off a 4 -metre kicker and landed safely in a giant airbag. The celebrity or celebrities that jumped the highest stayed in the competition, while whoever jumped the lowest was eliminated.

Results summary
Colour key

Episode details

Episode 1 (1 February)
 Event: Men's skeleton
 Location: Igls Sliding Centre

Live ski jump details

Episode 2 (2 February)
 Event: Women's skeleton
 Location: Igls Sliding Centre

Live ski jump details

Episode 3 (3 February)
 Event: Snow cross
 Location: Kühtai Saddle

Live air jump details

Episode 4 (4 February)
 Event: Parallel slalom
 Location: Kühtai Saddle

Live ski jump details

Episode 5 (5 February)
 Event: Bobsleigh
 Location: Igls Sliding Centre

Live ski jump details

Episode 6 (6 February)
 Event: Ski cross
 Location: Kühtai Saddle
There were two races of four celebrities. The top two in each race qualified for the next show. The bottom two in each race had to race one final time, from which the bottom three went on to face the jump.

Live air jump details

Episode 7: Semi-final (8 February)
 Event: Banked slalom snowboarding
 Location: Kühtai Saddle

Live ski jump details

Episode 8: Final (9 February)
 Event: Ski cross
 Location: Kühtai Saddle

Live air jump details

Live ski jump details (Round 1)

Live ski jump details (Round 2)

Ratings
Official ratings are taken from BARB, but do not include Channel 4 +1.

References

2015 British television seasons